Consume the Forsaken is the third studio album by American death metal band Disgorge. It is their only album with vocalist A.J. Magana.

Track listing

 "Demise of the Trinity" — 3:23
 "Perverse Manifestation" — 4:28
 "Manipulation of Faith" — 3:11
 "Consecrating the Reviled" — 2:35
 "Indulging Dismemberment of a Mutilating Breed" — 2:53
 "Consume the Forsaken" — 3:38
 "Dissecting thee Apostles" — 3:05
 "Denied Existence" — 3:44
 "Divine Suffering" — 4:45

Unique Leader Records albums
2002 albums
Disgorge (American band) albums